Anton Karl Simon Graf von Wolkenstein-Trostburg (2 August 1832 – 5 December 1913) was an Austro-Hungarian diplomat.

Biography 
Count Wolkenstein-Trostburg was born in Brunnersdorf (now Prunéřov, part of Kadaň in the Czech Republic). Initially in the military, he entered the diplomatic service in 1858 and became Counselor in London in 1870, in Berlin in 1877 and Envoy Extraordinary in Dresden in 1880. In 1881 he became section chief of the trade policy department in the Ministry of Foreign Affairs. He was involved in the negotiations on the Danube Crisis and in the conclusion of the trade agreements with the German Reich of 1878 and 1881. 

Finally, in March 1882, he became Austro-Hungarian Ambassador in St. Petersburg, a post he held for 12 years. In October 1894 he became Austro-Hungarian Ambassador in Paris for the next 9 years. He received the Order of the Golden Fleece in 1889. 

He married in 1886 with Marie von Schleinitz (1842–1912), widow of Alexander von Schleinitz, and  an influential salonnière in Berlin and one of the most important supporters of Richard Wagner. In 1903 he retired from the diplomatic service and from then on lived with his wife in Berlin, where she ran a famous literary salon in the Palast Hotel. The couple spent the warm season at Ivano Castle in Trentino, where the Count died in 1913, six months before the outbreak of the First World War.

References 
 Zeno

1832 births
1913 deaths
People from Kadaň
Austro-Hungarian diplomats
Austrian diplomats
Bohemian nobility
Knights of the Golden Fleece of Austria
Ambassadors of Austria-Hungary to Russia
Ambassadors of Austria-Hungary to France